These are the partial results of the athletics competition at the 1987 Mediterranean Games taking place between 19 and 24 September 1987 in Latakia, Syria.

Men's results

100 meters
Heats – 19 SeptemberWind: Heat 1: +2.6 m/s, Heat 2: +2.3 m/s

Final – 20 SeptemberWind: 0.0 m/s

200 meters
Heats – 21 SeptemberWind: Heat 1: -0.4 m/s, Heat 2: ? m/s

Final – 23 SeptemberWind: +2.2 m/s

400 meters
Heats – 20 September

Final – 21 September

800 meters
Heats – 23 September

Final – 24 September

1500 meters
20 September

5000 meters
21 September

10,000 meters
19 September

Marathon
24 September

110 meters hurdles
Heats – 19 SeptemberWind: Heat 1: +2.6 m/s, Heat 2: ? m/s

Final – 20 SeptemberWind: -0.5 m/s

400 meters hurdles
Heats – 20 September

Final – 21 September

3000 meters steeplechase
24 September

4 x 100 meters relay
24 September

4 x 400 meters relay
24 September

20 kilometers walk
19 September

High jump

Pole vault
23 September

Long jump

Triple jump

Shot put
19 September

Discus throw
21 September

Hammer throw
23 September

Javelin throw

Decathlon
19–20 September

Women's results

100 meters
Heats – 19 September

Final – 20 SeptemberWind: -1.1 m/s

200 meters
Heats

FinalWind: +1.6 m/s

400 meters

800 meters
Heats – 23 September

Final – 24 September

1500 meters
20 September

3000 meters
23 September

100 meters hurdles
Wind: -0.5 m/s

400 meters hurdles
Heats

Final – 20 September

4 x 100 meters relay

4 x 400 meters relay

High jump

Long jump
23 September

Shot put
24 September

Discus throw
20 September

Javelin throw
23 September

Heptathlon
September 23–24

References

Mediterranean Games
1987